Odmalea is a genus of stink bugs in the family Pentatomidae. There are at least four described species in Odmalea.

Species
These four species belong to the genus Odmalea:
 Odmalea basalis Walker, 1867
 Odmalea concolor (Walker, 1867)
 Odmalea schaefferi (Barber, 1906)
 Odmalea vega Rolston

References

Further reading

 
 

Pentatomidae genera
Articles created by Qbugbot
Pentatomini